Nordal Lunde (15 May 1875 – 23 November 1942) was a Norwegian sports shooter. He competed in two events at the 1920 Summer Olympics.

References

External links
 

1875 births
1942 deaths
Norwegian male sport shooters
Olympic shooters of Norway
Shooters at the 1920 Summer Olympics
Sportspeople from Lillehammer